The House-Museum of Jalil Mammadguluzadeh is a memorial museum of the famous Azerbaijani journalist, enlightener, writer-satirist, Jalil Mammadguluzadeh. The museum is located on Idris Mammadov Street in the city of Nakhchivan, the capital of the Nakhchivan Autonomous Republic.

History

The house-museum of Jalil Mammadguluzadeh was established on the order of the President of the Republic of Azerbaijan, Heydar Aliyev, on December 31, 1998. The inauguration of the museum took place on October 13, 1999.

Exhibition
The museum displays exhibits reflecting the life and work of Jalil Mammadguluzadeh. The museum exhibits personal belongings of Jalil Mammadguluzadeh's family, including historical documents relating to the Nakhchivan contemporaries, writer's classic works and his personal library.

Architectural features

The museum building is a historical and architectural monument of the XIX century. The building was built of raw bricks and later, baked with covered with baked bricks. Total of the building area and thickness of the walls are 100 m2 and 78 cm respectively. It consists of two floors. On the second floor there are 2 rooms, a vestibule and an open balcony. Entrance to the rooms and access to the balcony are from vestibule located in center. The first floor is located under the open balcony and consists of 2 rooms and a vestibule. It's possible to descend to the first floor and courtyard using brick stairs fixed to the balcony. On both floors, there are plenty of niches to put household items. The building was heated through the steam, which was placed on the wall of the room on the right side of the second floor.

See also
 House-Museum of Jalil Mammadguluzadeh (Baku)
 House-Museum of Jalil Mammadguluzadeh (Tbilisi)

References

Biographical museums in Azerbaijan
Museums established in 1998
1998 establishments in Azerbaijan
Historic house museums in Azerbaijan
Literary museums in Azerbaijan